OP5 Monitor is a software product for server, Network monitoring and management based on the Open Source project Naemon, is further developed and supported by OP5 AB. OP5 Monitor displays the status, health and performance of the IT network being monitored and has an integrated log server, OP5 Logger. The company sells downloadable software that monitor, visualize and troubleshoot IT environments and collect information both from hardware, software, virtual and/or cloud based services.

History
The company was founded in 2004 by Jan Josephson and Fredrik Åkerström in Stockholm, Sweden. The company was conceived to create an IT monitoring solution that can handle a large IT environment.

The company was acquired in August of 2018 and is now a subsidiary of ITRS Group.

Management Packs
Management packs are containers of pre-defined monitoring metrics. Users can create own packs and set their own standard on how to monitor a specific device within the network. They are available for   Generic servers, DNS servers,  Standalone VMware ESXi virtualization hosts,  Web servers with HTTPS,  Web server.json, and  Windows server

OP5 Monitor Extensions
The OP5 extensions are a set of products that provides specific functionality to increase control.  Add-ons for op5 Monitor is typically developed by partners or other software developing companies for extending or integrating op5 Monitor. They include:

 JIMO integration add-on for JIRA: Two-way communication between OP5 Monitor and JIRA. Add-on developed by Mogul 
 NetApp monitoring add-on: Monitor NetApp systems 
 Bischeck add-on: An open source project providing monitoring of applications and processes with dynamic behavior

Awards and recognition
OP5 has been mentioned in news and has received several awards, such as Cool Vendor by Gartner 2010

See also

 Comparison of network monitoring systems
 Pandora FMS An alternative to OP5

References

External links
 op5.com, official website

Network management
Nagios